ABCD is a list of the first four letters in the English alphabet.  It may also refer to:

Film 
 ABCD (film), a 2005 Tamil romance film
 ABCD 2, a 2015 Indian dance film
 ABCD: American-Born Confused Desi (2013 film), a 2013 Malayalam comedy film
 ABCD: American Born Confused Desi (2019 film), a 2019 Telugu drama film
 ABCD: Any Body Can Dance, a 2013 Bollywood film

Medicine

 ABC (medicine), also known as ABCD, a mnemonic for steps in resuscitation
 ABCD rating, a staging system for prostate cancer
 ABCD syndrome, a genetic disorder
 ABCD1, a protein
 ABCD2 score, a score for determining the risk of stroke after a transient ischemic attack

Science
 ABCD Schema, a highly structured data exchange and access model for taxon occurrence data (specimens, observations, etc. of living organisms)
 ABCD matrix analysis, a type of ray tracing technique used in the design of some optical systems
 ABCD-parameters, a type of properties describing the electrical behavior of linear electrical networks

Other uses
ABCd, American streaming service
 Action for Boston Community Development, a Boston, Massachusetts-based non-profit social services agency
 Asset-based community development, a methodology that seeks to uncover and highlight the strengths within communities
 Association of Better Computer Dealers, former name of CompTIA, an American non-profit trade association
 ABCD Region, an industrial district outside of São Paulo, Brazil
 American-Born Confused Desi, informal term for South Asian Americans born or raised in the United States
 ABCD: add, browse, change, delete, another representation of create, read, update and delete
 ABCD line, a Japanese term for embargoes placed against Japan by the Americans, British, Chinese and Dutch, as well as other countries
 ABCD ships, the first four steel ships built during the "New Navy" period of U.S. Naval history - USS Atlanta, Boston, Chicago and Dolphin
 Four major agriculture commodity companies
 Archer-Daniels-Midland
 Bunge
 Cargill
 Louis Dreyfus